The Women's omnium competition at the 2019 UCI Track Cycling World Championships was held on 1 March 2019.

Results

Scratch race
The race was started at 15:00.

Tempo race
The race was started at 17:04.

Elimination race
The elimination race was started at 19:30.

Points race and overall standings
The points race was started at 20:55.

References

Women's omnium
2019